Santiria is a genus of plants in the family Burseraceae.

Species include:

 Santiria apiculata Benn.
 Santiria dacryodifolia Kochummen
 Santiria griffithii (Hook. f.) Engl.
 Santiria impressinervis Kochummen
 Santiria kalkmaniana Kochummen
 Santiria laevigata Blume
 Santiria nigricans Kochummen
 Santiria sarawakana Kochummen
 Santiria tomentosa Blume

References

 
Burseraceae genera
Taxonomy articles created by Polbot